This is a complete list of women's alpine skiing World Cup champions in the overall and each discipline.  Multiple World Cups in the overall and in each discipline are marked with (#).

History
Combined events (calculated using results from selected downhill and slalom races) were included starting with the 1974–75 season, but a discipline trophy was only awarded during the next season (1975–76) and then once again starting with the 1979–80 season. Prior to the 2006–7 season, no trophy had been officially awarded for the combined since the late 1980s.  Note that no women's combined events were completed during the 2003–4 season.  The table below lists the leader of the combined standings each season even if no trophy was awarded.  

The Super G was added for the 1982–83 season, but from 1983 to 1985, Super G results were included with giant slalom, and a single trophy was awarded for giant slalom.

Overall podium

Winners by discipline

Milestones
 First to win 10 races in one event:  Annemarie Moser-Pröll  (downhill)
 First to win 20 races in one event:  Annemarie Moser-Pröll  (downhill)
 First to win 30 races in one event:  Annemarie Moser-Pröll  (downhill)
 First to win 40 races in one event:  Lindsey Vonn  (downhill)
 First to win 50 races in one event:  Mikaela Shiffrin  (slalom)

 First to win 10 races in two events:  Annemarie Moser-Pröll  (downhill and giant slalom)
 First to win 20 races in two events:  Vreni Schneider  (slalom and giant slalom)
 First to win 30 races in two events: pending
 First to win 40 races in two events: pending

 First to win races in three events:  Nancy Greene  (downhill, slalom and giant slalom)
 First to win races in four events:  Annemarie Moser-Pröll  (downhill, slalom, giant slalom and combined)
 First to win races in five events:  Petra Kronberger  (downhill, super G, slalom, giant slalom and combined)
 First to win races in six events:  Mikaela Shiffrin  (downhill, super G, slalom, giant slalom, combined and parallel slalom)
 First to win 10 races in three events: pending
 First to win 5 races in four events: pending
 First to win 5 races in all five events: pending

 NA - Disciplines didn't exist yet
 Seasons are shown in which the racer won
 Ties are shown in chronological order

See also
 List of FIS Alpine Ski World Cup men's champions
 List of alpine skiing world champions

External links
FIS-ski.com - official results for FIS alpine World Cup events
Ski-db.com - World Cup results database

Women's champions
World Cup, Women
Lists of female skiers
FIS
Skiing